Numancia is an administrative neighborhood (barrio) of Madrid belonging to the district of Puente de Vallecas.

As of 1 March 2020, it has a population of 48,815.

References 

Wards of Madrid
Puente de Vallecas